The Turks and Caicos Islands are divided into five administrative districts (one in the Turks Islands and four in the Caicos Islands), and the Island of Grand Turk; four of these are headed by District Commissioners, and Providenciales District is run by the Permanent Secretary of the Office of the Premier in Providenciales. The Island of Grand Turk is directly administered by the TCI Government.

(the area figures were determined from information in "TCI Physical Characteristics")

Electoral Districts
For the legislative council, the Turks and Caicos Islands are divided into fifteen Electoral Districts (four in the Turks Islands and eleven in the Caicos Islands):

An official web site mentions two additional electoral districts on Providenciales, namely Long Bay Hills and Richmond Hill, but without giving district numbers

For the November 2012 elections the Electoral District Boundary Commission has delineated 10 Electoral districts:
Grand Turk North - former West Road and Overback
Grand Turk South - former North and South Back Salina, and Salt Cay
South Caicos, East Caicos, Little and Big Ambergris Cays
Middle and North Caicos, and Parrot Cay
Leeward, Providenciales, Pine Cay, Little and Big Water Cays, and East Cays, including Dellis Cay
The Bight, Providenciales
Cheshire Hall and Richmond Hill, Providenciales
Blue Hills, Providenciales
Five Cays, Providenciales
Wheeland and North West and North Central, Providenciales, and West Caicos.

On August 14, 2012, Governor Roderic Todd signed into law the Electoral Districts (Boundaries Amendment) Ordinance.

2016 election results by constituency
By the time of the 2016 House of Assembly elections, there were 10 electoral districts ("constituencies") and the results were as follows:

See also
 ISO 3166-2 Subdivision codes for the Turks and Caicos Islands

Notes

References

External links
 List of ISO 3166-2 codes in the Turks and Caicos Islands
 Census 2012 Data

Turks and Caicos Islands
Geography of the Turks and Caicos Islands
Turks and Caicos Islands-related lists